Portugal participated in the Eurovision Song Contest 2006 with the song "Coisas de nada" written by José Manuel Afonso and Elvis Veiguinha. The song was performed by the group Nonstop. The Portuguese broadcaster Rádio e Televisão de Portugal (RTP) organised the national final Festival da Canção 2006 in order to select the Portuguese entry for the 2006 contest in Athens, Greece. The competition took place on 11 March 2006 where "Coisas de nada" performed by Nonstop emerged as the winner after tying for first place following the combination of votes from five-member jury panel and a public televote—the tie was decided in Nonstop's favour after their song scored the highest with the jury.

Portugal competed in the semi-final of the Eurovision Song Contest which took place on 18 May 2006. Performing during the show in position 19, "Coisas de nada" was not announced among the top 10 entries of the semi-final and therefore did not qualify to compete in the final. It was later revealed that Portugal placed nineteenth out of the 22 participating countries in the semi-final with 26 points.

Background 
Prior to the 2006 contest, Portugal had participated in the Eurovision Song Contest thirty-nine times since its first entry in 1964. The nation's highest placing in the contest was sixth, which they achieved in 1996 with the song "O meu coração não tem cor" performed by Lúcia Moniz. Following the introduction of semi-finals for the 2004, Portugal had, to this point, yet to feature in a final. Portugal's least successful result has been last place, which they have achieved on three occasions, most recently in 1997 with the song "Antes do adeus" performed by Célia Lawson. Portugal has also received nul points on two occasions; in 1964 and 1997. The nation failed to qualify to the final in 2005 with the song "Amar" performed by 2B.

The Portuguese national broadcaster, Rádio e Televisão de Portugal (RTP), broadcasts the event within Portugal and organises the selection process for the nation's entry. RTP confirmed Portugal's participation in the 2006 Eurovision Song Contest on 21 December 2005. The broadcaster has traditionally selected the Portuguese entry for the Eurovision Song Contest via the music competition Festival da Canção, with exceptions in 1988 and 2005 when the Portuguese entries were internally selected. On 10 January 2006, the broadcaster revealed details regarding their selection procedure and announced the organization of Festival da Canção 2006 in order to select the 2006 Portuguese entry.

Before Eurovision

Festival da Canção 2006 
Festival da Canção 2006 was the 42nd edition of Festival da Canção that selected Portugal's entry for the Eurovision Song Contest 2006. Ten entries competed in the competition which took place on 11 March 2006 at the Congress Centre in Lisbon. The show was hosted by Helena Coelho, Daniel Oliveira, Isabel Angelino, Jorge Gabriel, Helena Ramos and Eládio Clímaco and broadcast on RTP1 and RTP Internacional.

Competing entries 
Five producers were invited by RTP for the competition: Elvis Veiguinha, José Marinho, Luís Oliveira, Ramón Galarza and Renato Júnior. Each producer worked in coordination with two composers and performers on their songs which were required to be created and submitted in Portuguese (with exceptions for a small part of the song which could be in any other language). The competing artists were revealed on 16 February 2006.

Final 
The final took place on 11 March 2006. Ten entries competed and the winner, "Coisas de nada" performed by Nonstop, was selected based on the 50/50 combination of votes of a jury panel and a public televote. The jury that voted consisted of Filipe La Féria, Simone de Oliveira, Tozé Brito, Fátima Lopes and João Gobern. In addition to the performances of the competing entries, Alexandra Valentim, Filipe Santos, Pedro Mimoso, member of Portuguese Eurovision 2005 entrant 2B Rui Drumond, and Teresa Radamanto performed as the interval acts. Vânia de Oliveira and Nonstop were both tied at 22 points each but since Nonstop received the most points from the jury they were declared the winners.

Controversy 
The victory of Nonstop at Festival da Canção 2006 was contested by the public which preferred runner-up Vânia de Oliveira. Several online petitions were launched in favour of de Oliveira as the Portuguese entrant, while composer Carlos Coincas criticised RTP's failed efforts to revive the competition solely due to the controversial voting system and the broadcaster's selection of the jury members.

At Eurovision
According to Eurovision rules, all nations with the exceptions of the host country, the "Big Four" (France, Germany, Spain and the United Kingdom), and the ten highest placed finishers in the 2005 contest are required to qualify from the semi-final on 18 May 2006 in order to compete for the final on 20 May 2006; the top ten countries from the semi-final progress to the final. On 21 March 2006, a special allocation draw was held which determined the running order for the semi-final and Portugal was set to perform in position 19, following the entry from Lithuania and before the entry from Sweden. At the end of the show, Portugal was not announced among the top 10 entries in the semi-final and therefore failed to qualify to compete in the final. It was later revealed that Portugal placed nineteen in the semi-final, receiving a total of 26 points.

In Portugal, the two shows were broadcast on RTP1 and RTP Internacional with commentary by Eládio Clímaco. The Portuguese spokesperson, who announced the Portuguese votes during the final, was Cristina Alves.

Voting 
Below is a breakdown of points awarded to Portugal and awarded by Portugal in the semi-final and grand final of the contest. The nation awarded its 12 points to Sweden in the semi-final and to Ukraine in the final of the contest.

Points awarded to Portugal

Points awarded by Portugal

References

2006
Countries in the Eurovision Song Contest 2006
Eurovision